Elachista solena is a moth in the family Elachistidae. It is found in New Guinea.

The larvae feed on sugar cane. The larvae mine the leaves of their host plant.

References

Moths described in 1974
solena
Moths of Asia